Julie Wu is a Taiwanese-American novelist and medical doctor. She is the author of the novel The Third Son (2013), published by Algonquin Books.

Life and career 
Wu was born on April 2, 1967. She graduated from Harvard University with a Bachelor of Arts (B.A.) degree in Literature, magna cum laude, and received her Medical Doctorate (MD degree) from the Columbia College of Physicians and Surgeons. Wu entered the medical field partly because she believed that a medical career would benefit her as a writer. She completed her residency in internal medicine and then began practicing as a primary care physician. Wu then closed her medical practice upon wanting to focus her time on her writing and on her children. Wu is also a recipient of a 2012 Massachusetts Cultural Council fellowship, and has also received a writing grant from the Vermont Studio Center.  She was once enrolled at the Indiana University at Bloomington master's program in vocal performance.

Novels
Wu wrote and published The Third Son in 2013, via Algonquin Books. The novel revolves around a boy named Saburo and is set against the backdrop of occupied 1950s Taiwan and America at the dawn of the space age. The novel received positive reviews from The Boston Globe, O the Oprah Magazine, Kirkus Reviews, The Christian Science Monitor, Shelf Awareness and more.

Background on The Third Son
Upon researching the political history of Taiwan and learning of the "2/28", Wu decided to write a novel that communicated the experience of the Taiwanese under Japanese rule and bridged the silence surrounding this time period. Wu stated that the inspiration for her debut novel evolved first from an initial desire to write the "Great American Novel" to a desire to provide a voice for the Taiwanese and their history. Wu ultimately wanted to write a story that would educate the American public stating that, "...[the novel] evolved partly from [my parents'] story but...I really fictionalized it...so that it would introduce people who wouldn't normally learn about Taiwanese history to Taiwanese history."

References

Living people
21st-century American novelists
American writers of Taiwanese descent
American women writers of Chinese descent
American short story writers
American novelists of Chinese descent
Harvard College alumni
1967 births
Columbia University Vagelos College of Physicians and Surgeons alumni
21st-century American women writers